Concept Two, concept ii, CONCEPT 2, or variation, may refer to:

 Concept2, a rowing machine manufacturer
 Rimac Concept Two, an all-electric battery-powered hypercar
 AMC Concept II, a concept car proposed as a replacement for the Gremlin

See also
 Concept (disambiguation)
 2 (disambiguation)